Antonín Kučera was a Czech footballer who played as a defender.

Club career
During his playing career, Kučera played for Smíchov.

International career
On 1 April 1906, Kučera made his debut for Bohemia in Bohemia's second game, starting in a 1–1 draw against Hungary. It was Kučera's only cap for Bohemia.

Notes

References

Date of birth unknown
Date of death unknown
Association football defenders
Czech footballers
Czechoslovak footballers
Bohemia international footballers